The Manawatu rugby league team are a rugby league team that represents the Manawatu Rugby League in New Zealand Rugby League competitions. They have the nickname the Mustangs and between 2002 and 2007 competed in the Bartercard Cup as the Central Falcons.

Manawatu has a strong domestic scene and clubs compete in the "Western Alliance" region alongside Taranaki clubs.

History 
Rugby league in the region was first recorded in 1924 when a match was played between a Manawatu side against Wellington. All Black Alphonsus Carroll was part of the Manawatu team and the following season he was selected for New Zealand to tour Australia. The match with Wellington was drawn 14-14 and was played at Foxton. However it was not until 1971 that Manawatu had its first ever registered win, against Bay of Plenty 24 - 19. The season remains the team's most successful.

Lion Red Cup
In 1996 a Manawatu team was entered into the Lion Red Cup, replacing the Auckland Warriors' Colts. They were called the Manawatu Mustangs. This team was coached by Peter Sixtus.

Bartercard Cup

The Central Falcons were a franchise in the now defunct Bartercard Cup rugby league competition. They represented the Central North Island of New Zealand, playing home games in Palmerston North and Levin and were run by the Manawatu Rugby League. They were coached by former Kiwis international David Lomax.

They entered the competition in 2002 alongside the Taranaki Wildcats. They had a close relationship with the New Zealand Army and its base at Waiouru. In 2006 two New Zealand Warriors were assigned to the club; Micheal Luck & Steve Price.

Notable players included: Jesse Royal, Ricky Thorby and Russell Packer.

The side never made the finals and in the final season collected the wooden spoon. The club's best result was in 2005 when it finished Ninth out of Twelve teams.

Squad
On 7 June 2015 the following players were selected to play Hawke's Bay:

  Aaron Whitikia 
  Dylan Winiata 
  Jordan Kerr
  Tanira Cooper 
  Leon Walker 
  Manaia Osborne
  Haze Reweti 
  Kahura Cameron
  Rakai Tuheke 
  Denzel Lepua 
  Dane Cooper 
  Chevy Graham 
  Codie Christensen 
  Kane Kelleher 
  Tiwana Paringatai 
  Kele Kose 
  Gordon Karakaitana 
  Ihaka Johnson 
  Joe Ratu 
  Cory Governor 
  Leoango Tanginoa 
  Tereki Peneha

References

New Zealand rugby league teams
Rugby league in Manawatū-Whanganui
1957 establishments in New Zealand